Víctor Parra Reyes (10 January 1920 – 20 February 1994) was a Mexican actor and producer of the Golden Age of Mexican cinema. During his career, he won three Ariel Awards.

Selected filmography

As an actor
Champion Without a Crown (1946)
Sucedió en Jalisco (1947)
Corner Stop (1948)
Yo maté a Juan Charrasqueado (1949)
Angels of the Arrabal (1949)
El Suavecito (1951)
Los dineros del diablo (1953)
Northern Border (1953)
Reportaje (1953)
Los Fernández de Peralvillo (1954)
Espaldas mojadas (1955)
El Túnel 6 (1955)
Morir de pie (1957)
El jinete negro (1958)
Herencia trágica (1960)
El Asaltacaminos (1962)
La Muerte en el desfiladero (1963)

As a producer
Secuestro diabólico (1957)
Furias desatadas (1957)
Los Tigres del ring (1960)
El Torneo de la muerte (1960)

Awards and nominations

References

External links

1920 births
1994 deaths
20th-century Mexican male actors
Best Actor Ariel Award winners
Mexican male film actors
Mexican film producers
Male actors from Hidalgo (state)